Villapalacios is a municipality in Albacete, Castile-La Mancha, Spain. It has a population of 757. The hamlet houses the gothic style church of San Sebastián.

Municipalities of the Province of Albacete